Hotte is a surname. Notable people with the surname include:

Mark Hotte (born 1978), English footballer
Paul Hotte, Canadian production designer and art director
Richard Hotte (born 1948), Canadian academic and professor of information technology 
Tim Hotte (born 1963), English footballer